The Lemon Trees were a 1990s British pop band consisting of Guy Chambers, twin brothers Paul Stacey and Jeremy Stacey, Alex Lewis and Paul Holman. The band formed in 1993 and recorded two albums, but the second was not released. They disbanded in 1995.

Discography

Album
 Open Book (Oxygen Records/MCA - 1993)

Singles
 "Love Is in Your Eyes" (Oxygen/MCA - 1992) UK #75 - lead vocal by Guy Chambers
 "The Way I Feel" (Oxygen/MCA - 1992) #62 - lead vocal by Paul Holman
 "Let It Loose" (Oxygen/MCA - 1993) #55 - lead vocal by Guy Chambers
 "Child of Love" (Oxygen/MCA - 1993) #55 - lead vocal by Alex Lewis
 "I Can't Face the World" (Oxygen/MCA - 1993) #52 - lead vocal by Paul Holman

References

English pop music groups
Musical groups established in 1993
Musical groups disestablished in 1995
1993 establishments in the United Kingdom